Leucophlebia formosana is a moth of the family Sphingidae. It is known from China and Taiwan.

Subspecies
Leucophlebia formosana formosana (Taiwan)
Leucophlebia formosana chinaensis Eitschberger, 2003 (Shandong in China)

References

Leucophlebia
Moths described in 1936